Twilight series may refer to:
Twilight (novel series), a novel series of the 2000s by Stephenie Meyer, an american novelist.
The Twilight Saga (film series), a film series of the 2000s and 2010s based on the Stephenie Meyer novels

See also
Twilight (disambiguation)